The Galician Alternative of the Left (AGE) was an electoral alliance of left-wing independentist and federalist political parties in Galicia, Spain.

History
It was formed in early 2012, following a schism within the Galician Nationalist Bloc, to contest the 2012 Galician parliamentary election, in which it won nine seats, becoming the third party by size in the Galician Parliament, displacing the Galician Nationalist Bloc, and coming second in most of the major cities of Galicia.

The constituent parties of the coalition are: Renewal–Nationalist Brotherhood, the Galician affiliates of United Left and Equo, and Espazo Ecosocialista Galego.

In the 2014 European Parliament elections the coalition obtained 10.52% of the votes in Galicia (106,189 votes). The coalition won 11.65% in A Coruña province, 11.44% in Pontevedra province, 8.18% in Lugo province and 6.83% in Ourense province.

Composition

Electoral performance

Parliament of Galicia

European Parliament

References

External links
Official website
AGE in Europe website

2012 establishments in Spain
2016 disestablishments in Spain
Defunct left-wing political party alliances
Defunct political party alliances in Spain
Defunct socialist parties in Galicia (Spain)
Federalist parties in Spain
Political parties disestablished in 2016
Political parties established in 2012
United Left (Spain)